Barreh Suz (also Romanized as Barsūz; also known as Bahr Sūz and Barreh Sūz) is a village in Hoseynabad-e Goruh Rural District, Rayen District, Kerman County, Kerman Province, Iran. At the 2006 census, its population was 39, in 9 families.

References 

Populated places in Kerman County